Laws regarding incest (i.e. sexual activity between family members or close relatives) vary considerably between jurisdictions, and depend on the type of sexual activity and the nature of the family relationship of the parties involved, as well as the age and sex of the parties. Besides legal prohibitions, at least some forms of incest are also socially taboo or frowned upon in most cultures around the world.

Incest laws may involve restrictions on marriage, which also vary between jurisdictions. When incest involves an adult and a child (under the age of consent) it is considered to be a form of child sexual abuse.

Degrees of relationship

Laws regarding incest are sometimes expressed in terms of degrees of relationship. The degree of relationship is calculated by adding the number of generations back to a closest common ancestor of each individual. Consanguinity (but not affinity) relationships may be summarized as follows:

Most laws regarding prohibited degree of kinship concern relations of r = 25% or higher, while most permit unions of individuals with r = 12.5% or lower. In 24 states of the United States, cousin marriages are prohibited. Also, most laws make no provision for the rare case of marriage between double first cousins. Incest laws may also include prohibitions of unions between biologically unrelated individuals if there is a close legal relationship, such as adoption or step relations.

World map

Table

Africa

Côte d'Ivoire (Ivory Coast)
Consensual incest between cousins is legal in Côte d'Ivoire (Ivory Coast).

South Africa
In South Africa, since 2007, incest is the sexual penetration between persons who are related as follows:
 lineally, that is, if one person is a direct descendant of the other.
 within the first degree of consanguinuity, that is, where one person is a direct descendant of a parent of the other; this category includes siblings as well as an uncle or aunt with a niece or nephew.
 within the first degree of affinity, that is, where one person is the direct ancestor or descendant of the spouse of the other person.
 as adoptive parent and adopted child.

Before 2007, incest was a common law offence which extended to the same degrees of relationship but which applied only to vaginal intercourse.

Madagascar
Incest is illegal in Madagascar. According to Art. 335.3 - Any sexual relationship between close relatives or relatives up to the 3rd degree inclusive, in a direct or collateral line, the marriage of which is prohibited by law or any sexual abuse committed by the father or mother or another ascendant or a person having parental authority over a child is called incest.

Incest is punishable by forced labor in time if it was committed on the person of a child.

In other cases, incest is punishable by five to ten years imprisonment and a fine of 4,000,000 Ar to 20,000,000 Ar.

Zimbabwe
In Zimbabwe, most forms of incest are illegal and an offender is currently liable to a fine up to or exceeding level fourteen (about US$5000) or imprisonment for a period not exceeding five years or both. Incest is classified as "sexual intercourse within a prohibited degree of relationship". A prohibited degree of relationship would be that of a parent and their natural or adoptive child, a step-parent and their step-child, whether the step-child's parent and step-parent are married under the Marriage Act [Chapter 5:11] or the Customary Marriages Act [Chapter 5:07], or are parties to an unregistered customary law marriage, and whether or not the child was over the age of eighteen years at the time of the marriage; a brother and sister, whether of whole or half blood; or an uncle and his niece; or a grand-uncle and his grand-niece; or an aunt and her nephew; or a grand-aunt and her grand-nephew; or a grandparent and their grandchild and any person and their first or second cousin. In cases of first and second cousins an individual charged with such a crime can raise a defense that the cultural or religious customs or traditions of the community to which they belong does not prohibit marriage between first or second cousins; or in the case of a person who is a member of a community governed by customary law, that the cultural or religious customs or traditions of the particular community to which they belong does not prohibit marriage between first or second cousins.

Americas

Argentina
In Argentina, incest is legal if both individuals are over the minimum age of consent. Marriage between third-degree relatives and beyond is allowed, with the exception of marriage involving lineal ancestors and descendants, which is considered null and void disregarding the degree of separation (parent/offspring, grandparent-grandchild).

Brazil
Brazil has no criminal punishment if the involved are over the age of 14 (the clear age of consent in force; before 2011, though, sex with people as young as 12 and as old as 17 was in a legal grey area, with legal guardian-reported sex with those aged 12 and 13 being prosecuted as statutory rape, but unlike as with those aged 11 and younger not directly prosecuted by the State without a report by either the legal guardians or the adolescents themselves—unlike now, where the police forces prosecute all statutory rape-related cases without distinction—, and legal guardian-reported sex with those aged 14, 15, 16 and 17 being prosecuted as corruption of minors, but prosecution as corruption of minors for non-commercial consented sexual activity between people out of a defined hierarchy fell), capable of acting upon their legal rights, and that consent means that the relationship is absent of any kind of coercion or fraud.

First cousin marriages, once fairly common in some regions in the 19th century, are allowed on demand as all other marriages, while avunculate ones (those between uncles or aunts and nephews or nieces), the preferred by some Amazonian Amerindian tribes, and those between half-siblings, are allowed provided that those contracting it have a health check.

Brazilian law, by the Article 1521 of the Civil Code, also extends the invalidity of marriage between parents and children to grandparents and grandchildren or any other sort of ascendant-descendant relationship (both consanguineous and adoptive), parents-in-law and children-in-law even after the divorce of the earlier couple (see affinity), as well as to stepparents and stepchildren, and former husbands or wives to an adoptive parent who did this unilaterally (regarded as an equivalent, in families formed by adoption, to stepparents and stepchildren); and extends the invalidity of marriage between siblings to biological cousin-siblings. It also formerly prohibited the avunculate marriages and extended the prohibition for marriage between siblings to half-siblings, both cited above, but the Decrete Law 3.200/1941 made marriage possible for those non-ascended/descended in consanguinity of third degree (25%) provided both have health checks.

Brazilian law never held marriages between double first cousins as a reason for invalidity, even though those have a consanguinity as strong as that of half-siblings, and those, as other first cousins, are not asked health checks to marry, doing so in the same way as non-related people. Also legally treated much like non-related people are stepsiblings, while those who are stepsiblings and half-siblings (that is, those who have a half-sibling who is also child of a latter married spouse of one's parent) are treated like half-siblings who are not stepsiblings, being demanded health checks before marrying.

Canada
Under Canadian federal law, incest is defined as having a sexual relationship with a sibling (including half-sibling), child/parent or grandchild/grandparent, requiring knowledge of the existence of the blood relationship. Everyone who commits incest is guilty of an indictable offence and is liable to imprisonment for a term of not more than 14 years and, if the other person is under the age of 16 years, to a minimum punishment of imprisonment for a term of five years.

United States

Laws regarding incest in the United States vary widely among jurisdictions regarding both the definition of the offense and penalties for its commission. The laws regarding incest in the United States article summarizes these laws for individual U.S. states and the District of Columbia.

In the United States, the District of Columbia and every state and inhabited territory have some form of codified incest prohibition. In most states, sexual activity between a lineal ancestor and a lineal descendant (parent, grandparent with child or grandchild), siblings (brother-sister) and aunt-nephew, uncle-niece is penalized as incest. However, individual statutes vary widely. Rhode Island has repealed its criminal incest statute, and only criminalizes incestuous marriage. Ohio "targets only parental figures", and New Jersey does not apply any penalties when both parties are 12 years of age or older. The most severe penalties for incest are in Massachusetts, Virginia, Texas and Oregon, which punish incest with up to 20 years in prison, Georgia where a penalty for incest is up to 30 years in prison, Wisconsin where the penalty for incest is up to 40 years in prison, and in the states of Colorado, Nevada, Montana, Idaho and Michigan where a penalty of up to life imprisonment for incest may be given.

In some states, sex between first cousins is prohibited (see cousin marriage law in the United States by state for cousin sex, as well as cousin marriage, being outlawed in some states). Many states also apply incest laws to non-blood relations, including stepparents, stepsiblings, in-laws and people related through adoption.

Asia

China (Mainland)

Criminal Law of the People's Republic of China Chapter 4 prohibit rape and sexual assault, but not consensual incest. Since the  age of consent is 14, this implies that incest sex is legal if both are over 14.

Hong Kong
In Hong Kong, it is illegal to have sexual intercourse with certain close relatives, even if they are consenting adults. The prohibited relationships are grandfather-granddaughter, father-daughter, brother-sister and mother-son. Punishment is up to 20 years' imprisonment for male offenders and up to 14 years' imprisonment for female offenders. The law does not cover sexual intercourse with more distant relatives, such as an aunt, uncle, niece, nephew and cousin. It only addresses male-on-female and female-on-male sexual intercourse, and it appears that consensual same-sex incest is not illegal. The law makes an assumption that a female below the age of 16 has no ability to consent to sexual intercourse, therefore a female below 16 cannot commit incest.

On 5 December 2019, the Law Reform Commission of Hong Kong ("LRC") published a report on Review of Substantive Sexual Offences making final recommendations for the reform of substantive sexual offences in the Crimes Ordinance (Cap 200). It recommended that "the offence of incest should be reformed to become gender neutral; to cover all penile penetration of the mouth, vagina and anus and other forms of penetration; and be extended to cover uncles (aunts) and nieces (nephews) who are blood relatives as well as adoptive parents"

India
The Indian Penal Code (IPC) does not contain any specific provision against incest  and also there is no law to support incest relationships, but there are general provisions relating to sexual abuse of children by their custodian, such as a parent or teacher. Moreover the rule of kinship or marriage depends on one’s religion and is governed by the different marriage laws. The general rule under Section 5 of the Hindu Marriage Act is that marriage between people who have a sapinda relationship is prohibited unless there is a custom that allows the same.

Japan
Consensual incest between adults is legal in Japan. However, Article 179 of Penal Code stated that a person who "commits an indecent act upon" or "engages in sexual intercourse, etc." with another person "under eighteen years of age by taking advantage of the influence arising from the fact of having custody of that person" is punished in the same manner as prescribed in Article 176 ("Indecency through Compulsion") ie imprisonment for not less than 6 months but not more than 10 years.

South Korea
The Criminal Act does not prohibit consensual incest. Starting from 20 August 2019, ACT ON SPECIAL CASES CONCERNING THE PUNISHMENT, ETC. OF SEXUAL CRIMES stipulated that a person who rapes (i.e. through violence or intimidation, has sexual intercourse with) another person in a consanguineous or marital relationship (relatives by blood or marriage within the fourth degree or residing together, including a de facto relationship) shall be punished by imprisonment for a fixed term of at least seven years, which is heavier penalty than that targeting raping in general (at least three years imprisonment) stipulated by the Criminal Act.

Article 809 of the Korean Civil Code allowed Koreans with the same surname to have marital relations if they were not closely related. Previously it was banned culturally and codified by law in 1957. The law now requires the separation of lineage to be at least third or fourth cousins.

Macau
According to Macau's civil code, people in direct line kinship or in the second degree of collateral kinship cannot marry each other.

Malaysia
In Malaysia, it is incest to have sexual intercourse with a person who under the law, religion, custom or usage that applies to the person he or she is not permitted to marry on account of their relationship.

In addition to whipping, persons convicted of incest face a minimum sentence of six years' imprisonment and a maximum sentence of 20 years' imprisonment. It is a defense against the charge if the person did not know the relationship was not permitted or if the sexual intercourse was done without his or her consent. Girls below the age of 16 and boys below the age of 13 are deemed to be incapable of giving consent. (The age of consent for sex in Malaysia is 16 for both sexes.)

While it is unclear to which family members the incest law applies, a verdict from the High Court in Sabah and Sarawak in 2011 provided some indication about the sentencing guidelines. It described incest as a "heinous crime" but that the degree of kinship between the parties dictates the "level of repulsion" which the court translates into a sentence imposed. The verdict said the worst on such a scale is incest committed by a father to his biological daughter or a brother to his biological sister, and that such offenders should receive the harshest sentence. It said an uncle and his maternal niece committing incest is not on that same level and, if there was no violence involved, the length of the sentence should reflect it.

There are more severe sentences for those who commit incest through rape. The offence of incestuous rape is punishable with not less than eight years' imprisonment and not more than 30 years' imprisonment. In addition, those convicted receive not less than 10 strokes.

Malaysian law also considers sexual intercourse with the stepfamily to be incestuous.

Pakistan
The legal code of Pakistan defines incest as marriage (consortion) between a male and either his:
 wife or former wife of father, grandfather and further ancestors
 Mother, grandmother and further ancestors
 Daughter, granddaughter and further descendants
 full or half-sister
 parents' sisters, grandparents' sisters and further ancestors' sisters
 daughter, granddaughter and further descendant of full or half-sibling
 suckling ancestor
 suckling sister
 Mother, grandmother and further ancestors of wife or former wife
 Daughter, granddaughter of wife or former wife
 Wife or former wife of true son or grandson and further descendants
 Sororal polygyny
Both participants are guilty if they commit the above acts and are charged with zina.

Philippines
Article 81 of the Civil Code of the Philippines considers marriages between the following incestuous and void from their performance:
 Between brothers and sisters, whether of the full or half blood;
 Between collateral relatives by blood within the fourth civil degree

A similar prohibition can be found in Articles 37 and 38 of the Family Code.

In the 1973 visa proceedings case of In re: Bautista, an Immigration Officer denied entry to a married couple who were second cousins. In reaching the decision, the immigration officer relied on subsection 1 of Article 81 of the Civil Code. However, on appeal, it was found that the parties were collateral relatives and therefore fell under subsection 2 of the same Code, which prohibits marriages between relatives by blood within the fourth civil degree. The fourth civil degree includes first cousins. Second cousins, who are the children of first cousins, fall under the fifth civil degree and are not covered by the prohibition. The marriage, being valid under the laws of the place of celebration, was then recognized for immigration purposes only.

In addition, the Code of Muslim Personal Laws of the Philippines prohibit by consanguinity (tahrimjbin-nasab) the following marriages:
 Ascendants and descendants of any degree;
 Brothers and sisters, whether germane, consanguine or uterine; and
 Brothers or sisters and their descendants within the third civil degree.

While incestuous marriage is illegal in the Philippines, there is no legislation which prohibits out-of-marriage incestuous sexual acts between two consenting adults.

Singapore
Section 376G of the Penal Code specifies that 
"Any person (A) of or above 16 years of age who —
(a)	penetrates, with A’s penis, the vagina, anus or mouth, as the case may be, of a person of or above 16 years of age who is a close family relative (B);
(b)	sexually penetrates, with a part of A’s body (other than A’s penis, if A is a man) or anything else, the vagina or anus, as the case may be, of a person of or above 16 years of age who is a close family relative (B);
(c)	causes or permits a man of or above 16 years of age who is a close family relative (B) to penetrate, with B’s penis, the vagina, anus or mouth, as the case may be, of A; or
(d)	causes or permits a person of or above 16 years of age who is a close family relative (B) to sexually penetrate, with a part of B’s body (other than B’s penis, if B is a man) or anything else, the vagina or anus, as the case may be, of A, knowing that B is a close family relative, shall be guilty of an offence."

Taiwan

In Taiwan, Article 230 of the Criminal Code of the Republic of China prohibits sexual intercourse between any lineal relatives by blood or collateral relatives within the third degree of relationship by blood. Violators may be imprisoned for up to five years.

Article 968 of the Civil Code states that "the degree of relationship by blood between a person and his lineal relative by blood shall be determined by counting the number of generations upwards or downwards from himself [as the case may be], one generation being taken as one degree. As between the person and his collateral relative, the degree of relationship shall be determined by the total number of generations counting upwards from himself to the common lineal ancestor and then from such common ancestor downwards to the relative by blood with whom the degree of relationship is to be determined."

Thailand
Incestuous relations between persons (over 15 years old) are not prohibited by law, though a marriage cannot take place if the man and woman have blood relations in the direct ascendant or descendant line, or brother or sister of full or half blood. The said relationship shall be in accordance with blood relation without regard to its legitimacy.

Turkey
Sibling marriage and avunculate marriage is prohibited, while cousin marriage is legal. Marriage between parents and offspring is also prohibited, even when there is no blood relationship, i.e. adoptive parent or parent-in-law.

Vietnam
Incest between people of direct blood line is illegal in Vietnam and is punishable by sentencing to between six months and five years of imprisonment.

Europe
Countries that prohibit incest include: (all articles refer to the Penal Codes) Albania Article 106, Slovenia Article 195, Slovakia Section 203, Serbia Article 197, Poland Article 201, Norway Article 197 and 198, Hungary Article 199, Bulgaria Article 154, and Cyprus Article 147.

Countries that allow consensual incest if both are over the age of consent include Belarus, Belgium, Estonia, Latvia, Lithuania, France, Russia, Spain, Ukraine, and Portugal.Russia and Belarus also allow incest between teenagers (under 18)  Estonia, Latvia, and Ukraine prohibit incest if one has custody over the other

Austria
In Austria, incest between lineal ancestors and descendants and between full siblings is prohibited. It is punishable by up to three years in prison.

Belarus  
There seems to be no law criminalizing incest Section 168 of the criminal code prohibits sex (including incest sex) with anyone under 16 (the age of consent) if the older person is an adult over 18.  Note that this also allows incest sex if both are teenagers under 18.

Czech Republic
Section 188 of the Czech Criminal code prohibits incest between lineal ancestors and descendants and siblings. The maximum penalty is three years of imprisonment.

Denmark
In Denmark, incest is sex between lineal ancestors and descendants and between full siblings. Sex with a descendant is punishable by up to six years imprisonment. Sex between siblings is punishable by up to two years imprisonment.

Estonia
In Estonia, sexual intercourse or commission of another act of sexual nature by a parent, person holding parental rights or grandparent with a child or grandchild
is punishable by two to eight years imprisonment.

Finland
In Finland, sexual acts between one's full sibling (but not half-sibling), ancestor or descendant are punishable by a fine or up to two years in prison for "sexual act between close relatives". However, no punishment is given to a person who was under 18 years old when performing a sexual act with a parent or grandparent or if the person was forced or illegally persuaded to perform the sexual act. The marriage law defines, that marriage between one's sibling, half-sibling, ancestor or descendant is forbidden.

France, Belgium, and Luxembourg
The 1810 penal code, which was promulgated by Napoleon I and adopted throughout most of Europe, abolished incest laws in France, Belgium, and Luxembourg.

In 2010, France reinstated laws against incest by introducing article 222-31-1 of the penal code. From February 10, 2010, to September 17, 2011, rape and sexual assault were classified as incest when they are committed "within the family on a minor by an ascendant, a brother, a sister or any other person, including a cohabitant of a family member, who has de jure or de facto authority over the victim."

There were subsequently multiple changes to the definition of incest.

On 16 September 2011, the Constitutional Council repealed article 222-31-1 of the penal code, saying that if it was possible for the legislator to institute a particular penal qualification to designate incestuous sexual acts, they could not, without disregarding the principle of legality of offences and penalties, refrain from precisely designating the persons who must be considered, within the meaning of this qualification, as members of the family.

Incest was once again reinstated on 2016. From March 16, 2016, to August 6, 2018, rape and sexual assault are considered incestuous when they are committed on a minor by:

(1) An ascendant;
(2) A brother, sister, uncle, aunt, nephew or niece;
(3) The spouse or partner of one of the persons mentioned in (1) and (2) or the partner bound by a civil solidarity pact with one of the persons mentioned in the same 1° and 2°, if he or she has de jure or de facto authority over the minor.

On 6 August 2018, "if he of she has de jure or de facto authority over the minor" in (3) was changed to "if he or she has de jure or de facto authority over the victim."

Germany
In Germany, illegal incest is defined as vaginal intercourse between lineal ancestors and descendants (parents, grandparents, great-grandparents and their children, grandchildren, great-grandchildren) and between full and half-siblings (due to this definition other sexual practices, including homosexual intercourse, are not punishable). The penalty is a fine or up to three years of prison. Incest between relatives who are minors (below 18 years old) at the time of offence is not punishable but remains a crime, therefore aiding and abetting of incest between related minors is punishable.

Regarding marriage, the same rules apply and prohibit marriage between aforementioned relatives, but also includes marriages between siblings by adoption.

The criminal liability of incest among consenting adults is disputed among German citizens and politicians. In the case of Patrick Stübing, the Federal Constitutional Court ruled in 2008 that the criminalization of incest is constitutional in a 7:1 vote with one judge dissenting.

In September 2014 the majority of the German Ethics Council recommended that the government abolish laws criminalizing consensual incest between adult siblings, while not broaching the question of to what extent criminal liability for incest between parents and children of legal age might be abrogated.

In a dissenting vote, nine members of the Council explain that they oppose any repeal of Section 173 of the Criminal Code or a change that would qualify criminal liability. In this view, the central concern of the provision is precisely the protection of the integrity and incommensurability of different familial roles as an important precondition to successful personality development. They acknowledge that under the purview of Section 173 of the Criminal Code, some couples run afoul of a tragic life-situation. For these persons, some reckoning could be made, even without a statutory intervention into the process of the application of the law, for instance by closing an investigation by a public prosecutor.

Greece
Article 345 of the Greek Penal Code as modified by Article 2, Paragraph 8 of Law 3625/2007 and Article 3 Paragraph 10 of Law 3727/2008 prohibits incestuous relations between relatives of both ascending and descending line, and between half or full siblings, and imposes (1) for the ascending relative (for example father, uncle, grandfather etc.): at least 10 years' imprisonment if the descending relative is under 15 years old, imprisonment if 15 but not 18 years old, and maximum two years' imprisonment if 18 years and older; (2) for the descending relative (for example child, nephew etc.) maximum two years' imprisonment; (3) for half- or full siblings maximum two years' imprisonment. Paragraph 2 of Article 345 Penal Code also states that if the descending relative and the half or full siblings were under 18 years old, they might be cleared of any charge.

Also, Article 1357 of the Greek Civil Code prohibits the marriage of relatives of direct blood line in totality, and up the four degrees of consanguinity of the secondary blood line (for example you can marry the first cousin of your mother / father, but not your first cousin). Article 1358 of the Greek Civil Code also prohibits the marriage of relatives in law totally in direct blood line, and up the third degree of the secondary blood line.

Iceland
Article 200 of the Icelandic Penal Code prohibits incestuous relations between relatives of both ascending and descending line, and between half or full siblings, and (1) imposes for the ascending relative (for example father, uncle, grandfather etc.): imprisonment up to a maximum of 12 years if the descending relative is between 15 and 17 years old, imprisonment up to a maximum of eight years if 18 years and older; (2) for siblings a maximum four years' imprisonment—if the half or full siblings were under 18 years old, they might be cleared of any charge.

Republic of Ireland
Incest is illegal in the Republic of Ireland under the Punishment of Incest Act 1908, which pre-dates the foundation of the state.

It is illegal for a male to have sexual intercourse with his granddaughter, mother, daughter, sister, or half-sister; and for a female (over 16 years of age) with her grandfather, father, son, brother, or half-brother. The act does not refer to other familial relationships (such as grandson-grandmother), or same-sex relations.

Prior to the amendment of the 1908 Act in 2019, incest was punishable by up to seven years' imprisonment for a female and up to life imprisonment for a male. The Criminal Law (Sexual Offences) (Amendment) Act 2019 amended the Act of 1908 to provide for a maximum term of 10 years' imprisonment for both males and females.

Occasionally, offenders convicted of incest will be admitted to a psychiatric hospital for psychiatric treatment.

Italy
Incest is illegal in Italy only if it provokes public scandal, according to Article 564 of the Penal code and punishable from two to eight years' imprisonment, open to more years for the older person if the other was under aged.
For incest to be a “public scandal” the incest must be done in a blatant manner.  The fact that someone reports incest to the authorities does not by itself make it a public scandal.

Latvia
Incest is not criminally prohibited in Latvia except as part of the general protection of adolescents from sexual abuse.

Lithuania
Criminal Code of Lithuania does not explicitly foresee a criminal punishment for incest between adults. However, it does state that "A father, mother, guardian, custodian or another lawful representative of a child or a person holding statutory powers in respect of a minor who has sexual intercourse or otherwise satisfied his sexual desires with that minor, in the absence of characteristics of a rape, sexual assault or sexual abuse, shall be punished by a fine or by restriction of liberty or by arrest or by a custodial sentence for a term of up to six years." Thereby, the law explicitly foresees a criminal punishment for incest between a parent and a child or for persons of similar standing.

Netherlands
Consensual incest between adults is legal in the Netherlands. Marriage is forbidden between ancestors and descendants or between siblings, although the Minister of Justice may grant dispensation in the case of siblings by adoption. Marriage between blood relations of the third and fourth degree are possible, but require both partners to sign a declaration of consent. (Dutch civil law book 1, articles 41 and 42.)

Norway
Incest is illegal in Norway and is defined as intercourse between ancestors and descendants (including adopted descendants), siblings, and even stepfamily. It is punishable by up to six years in prison.

Poland
In Poland, incest is defined in Article 201 of the Penal Code as sexual intercourse with an ancestor, descendant, guardian, ward, brother, or sister, and is punishable by imprisonment for no less than three months and no more than five years.

Portugal
Incest is not specifically prohibited under Portuguese law.

Romania
Incest is defined in the Penal Code as "consensual sexual relations between lineal relatives or between siblings" and is punished by a year to five years in prison.

Russia
In Russia, consensual sex (including incest sex) between adults, teenagers (12-18), or an adult with a teenager 16 or older, is not a crime. However, under the Family Code of Russia, persons who are related lineally, siblings, half-siblings, and a stepparent and a stepchild may not marry.

Slovenia
Incest in Slovenia is not criminally prohibited unless one person is a minor. A person who has sexual relations with a blood relation minor is punished to two years in prison.

Spain
Consensual incest is legal in Spain since there is no law against it.  But both must be over the age of consent of 16 to have sex.Incest is not Illegal in Spain

Sweden
Incest with a descendant or a full sibling is prohibited by law in Sweden. Incest with Descendants is not a crime same for same-sex siblings. Half-siblings can engage in sexual intercourse and even marry, but require special approval by the government.

Switzerland
Article 213 of the Swiss Criminal Code prohibits incest. Intercourse among siblings or other persons related by blood in direct line is punishable by up to three years' imprisonment. The federal government proposed to abolish this prohibition in 2010, arguing that in the few cases where persons were convicted of incest (three since 1984), other sexual crimes such as child sexual abuse were also committed.

Ukraine
There appears to be no law prohibiting incest  but there is a law restricting it.  Article 155 of the criminal code prohibits penetrative sex with anyone under 16. The same article also prohibits incest with a person under 16 with whom one has custodial authority (such as father-minor-daughter).

United Kingdom

Legislation regarding sexual offences in the United Kingdom is devolved. Sex with an adult who is related as parent, adoptive parent, grandparent, child, adopted child, grandchild, brother, sister, half-brother, half-sister, uncle, aunt, nephew or niece, is illegal. In England and Wales the offence is against the Sexual Offences Act 2003 which effectively replaced the offence of incest with two new wider groups of offences: familial child sex offences (sections 25–29) and sex with an adult relative (sections 64–65). The punishment for sex between adults knowingly related in the aforementioned ways via penetration is liable to a maximum imprisonment for a term not exceeding two years. While sexual activity with a child family member can incur imprisonment for a term not exceeding 14 years. These laws are intended to protect the rights of people, so as to avoid potential violation. However, these laws still outlaw consensual sexual relationships between family members, even if they are fully willing and knowledgeable of the potential consequences. There has been some debate surrounding the rhetoric used by the Sexual Offences Review Team. Roffee discusses how the language used manipulates the reader to deem consensual familial sexual acts as not only illegal, but also immoral. In Northern Ireland similar offences are against the Sexual Offences (Northern Ireland) Order 2008.

In Scotland the offence is against the Criminal Law (Consolidation) (Scotland) Act 1995, the provisions of which effectively replaced the Incest and Related Offences (Scotland) Act 1986 (although the 1986 Act was not actually repealed until 2010). Prior to the 1986 Act the law was based on the Incest Act 1567 which incorporated into Scots criminal law Chapter 18 of the Book of Leviticus, using the version of the text of the Geneva Bible of 1562. In January 2016 a petition calling for "Adult Consensual Incest" to be decriminalised was submitted to the Scottish Parliament's Public Petitions Committee, but the petition was not debated and no change was made to the law.
In August 2016 and December 2017, further petitions were submitted to the Scottish Parliament's Public Petitions Committee.

Oceania

Australia
In Australia, federal marriage law prohibits marriage between an ancestor and descendant or siblings (including a sibling of half-blood), including those traced through adoption. However, under federal law, sexual conduct between consenting adults (18 years of age or older) is legal, which also applies to close family members. Subject to this overriding federal law, incest continues in the statute books as a crime in every Australian jurisdiction, but what constitutes incest and penalties vary.

In all Australian states and territories except New South Wales, sexual intercourse between a lineal ancestor and a lineal descendant is incest. In New South Wales, incest involves "close family members", which are "parent, son, daughter, sibling (including a half-brother or half-sister), grandparent or grandchild, being such a family member from birth". In Queensland, unlawful incest also includes sexual intercourse between an uncle or aunt with their niece or nephew, although here its application is curtailed by the effect of the federal Marriage Act 1961, as the Queensland Criminal Code states that the crime of incest does not apply to "persons who are lawfully married or entitled to be lawfully married". Thus it is not incest for a niece aged 16 or over to engage in sexual intercourse with her uncle or a nephew aged 16 or over to engage in sexual intercourse with his aunt. The same principles apply in a same-sex context, as the Marriage Act allows same-sex marriage.

In New South Wales incest is generally only applied in cases where both participants are aged 16 or over (the age of consent in the state). Where a participant is aged between 10 and 16 years of age the older participant would generally be charged with sexual intercourse with a child under the age of 16, while in cases when a participant is under 10, the older participant would generally be charged with sexual intercourse with a child under the age of 10.

In the other states and territories, incest can also arise where one of the parties is below the age of consent, but this does not exclude the possibility of bringing the more general charge of sexual intercourse with a child under the age of 10 (New South Wales and Northern Territory), 12, 16 or 17 (South Australia and Tasmania) as the case may be. This is particularly relevant where a certain form of sexual conduct between related persons falls outside of the legal definition of incest in a particular jurisdiction.

In no state or territory is consent a defense to incest. The maximum penalty for incest varies: eight years' imprisonment in New South Wales; 10 years' imprisonment in South Australia; 20 years' imprisonment in Western Australia and the Australian Capital Territory; 25 years' imprisonment in the Northern Territory, Victoria, and Tasmania; and life imprisonment in Queensland. After one conviction for incest, the offender's name is placed on the sex offender registry for 15 years, while any offender with two or more convictions for incest has their name placed on the registry for the remainder of their life.

No particular laws apply to relationships arising from a sperm donation.

Papua New Guinea
Incest is illegal in Papua New Guinea.

New Zealand
In New Zealand, incest is sexual connection between a parent and child (both biological and adopted), grandparent and grandchild (both biological and adopted), and full and half-siblings.

It is a defence if the person was unaware of the relationship at the time of the act (i.e. accidental incest). A conviction for incest attracts a maximum penalty of 10 years' imprisonment. Incest is the only sexual crime punishable by seven years or more imprisonment that is not subject to the country's "three-strikes" law.

It is also illegal in New Zealand to have a sexual connection with a dependent child under 18; this includes step-children, foster children and wards. A conviction for having a sexual connection, or attempting to have a sexual connection, with a dependent child attracts a maximum penalty of seven years' imprisonment.

See also
 Jewish views on incest
 Mahram

References

External links
 Hughes, Graham. "The Crime of Incest." Journal of Criminal Law and Criminology, Fall 1964. Volume 55, Issue 3 (September), Article 2, p. 322-331.

World Population Review:Where incest is legal 

Incest laws and map for Europe 

Lifting the veil on incest The historical development of the offense

Family law
Incest
Sex laws